Alexander Mikhailovich Anissimov (Анисимов, Александр Михайлович; born 8 October 1947) is a Russian conductor.

In 1995 he was appointed Principal Guest Conductor of the National Symphony Orchestra of Ireland.

References

1947 births
Living people
People's Artists of the RSFSR
21st-century Russian conductors (music)
Russian male conductors (music)
21st-century Russian male musicians